The Midnight Gospel is an American adult animated streaming television series created by Adventure Time creator Pendleton Ward and comedian Duncan Trussell. Released on Netflix on April 20, 2020, it is the first animated production from Ward for Netflix. It sets actual podcast interviews between Trussell and various guests into fantastic adventures, typically telling a story alongside the real podcast audio through the environment and extra voice work by Trussell and the guests of the original podcast.

Set in a dimension known as the Chromatic Ribbon, a spacecaster named Clancy Gilroy owns an unlicensed multiverse simulator. Through it, he travels through bizarre worlds on the brink of disaster, interviewing some of their residents for his spacecast. The interviews are derived from earlier episodes of Trussell's podcast The Duncan Trussell Family Hour. Special guests include Phil Hendrie, Stephen Root, Drew Pinsky, Damien Echols, Trudy Goodman, Jason Louv, Caitlin Doughty, Michael Marcanio, Maria Bamford, Joey Diaz, David Nichtern, and Deneen Fendig.

In June 2022, Trussell announced that Netflix cancelled the series after one season.

Synopsis 
The Midnight Gospel revolves around a spacecaster named Clancy Gilroy, who lives on the Chromatic Ribbon, a membranous, tape-like planet situated in the middle of a colorful void where simulation farmers use powerful bio-organic computers to simulate a variety of universes from which they harvest natural resources and new technology. Each episode revolves around Clancy's travels through planets within the simulator, with the beings inhabiting these worlds as the guests he interviews for his spacecast. These interviews are based on actual interviews, with real audio derived from Trussell's podcast, The Duncan Trussell Family Hour. The episodes typically end with an apocalyptic event from which Clancy barely manages to escape.

Cast and characters

Main 
 Duncan Trussell as Clancy Gilroy

Recurring 
 Phil Hendrie as Universe Simulator and various characters
 Stephen Root as Bill Taft and various characters
 Maria Bamford as Butt Demon and various characters
 Doug Lussenhop as Daniel Hoops and various characters
 Joey "Coco" Diaz as Chuck Charles, Steve and various characters
 Christina P. as Bobua and various characters
 Steve Little as Captain Bryce and various characters
 Johnny Pemberton as Cornelius and various characters

Guests 
 Drew Pinsky as Little President (Episode 1 and Episode 5)
 Natasha Leggero as Peggy (Episode 1)
 Anne Lamott as Anne Deer Dog (Episode 2)
 Raghu Markus as Raghu Deer Dog (Episode 2)
 Damien Echols as Darryl the Fish (Episode 3)
 Trudy Goodman as Trudy the Love Barbarian (Episode 4)
 Pauly Shore as Prince Jam Roll (Episode 4)
 Jason Louv as Jason (Episode 5)
 Eddie Pepitone as Bob (speaking voice) (Episode 5) 
 Johanna Warren as Bob (singing voice) (Episode 5)
 David Nichtern as His Divine Grace, God's Scientist (Episode 1) and David (Episode 6)
 Dante Pereira-Olson as Shanerreyus (Episode 6)
 Will Oldham as Bubble Max (Episode 6)
 Caitlin Doughty as Death (Episode 7)
 Deneen Fendig as herself aka Mrs. Gilroy (Clancy's/Duncan's mother) (Episode 8)
 Ram Dass as Ram Dass (Episode 8)

Episodes 
All episodes were directed by Pendleton Ward, and written by Mike L. Mayfield, Duncan Trussell and Pendleton Ward, with Brendon Walsh co-writing "Officers and Wolves" and Meredith Kecskemety co-writing "Blinded by My End".

Development

Concept and creation 
While working on Adventure Time, Pendleton Ward heard about Duncan Trussell's podcast The Duncan Trussell Family Hour from a friend with whom he worked on the show. Ward became interested in the podcast because of his taste for listening to people talking about philosophy. According to Ward, "Duncan is a lot of fun." Around 2013, during the start of his podcast broadcast, Trussell received an email from Ward praising him for his podcast. About a year later, Ward stepped down as showrunner for Adventure Time. Despite saying in an interview that he would not work on another series, Ward was taking the first steps in a new series anchored in the adaptation of Trussell's podcast. Sometime later Trussell and Ward became friends and Ward suggested to Trussell to turn his podcast into an animated series. According to Ward, Trussell had the ability to make 2 hours of a meditation conversation funny. Trussell says: "He reached out to me and said he had an idea for how to animate my podcast, which was another big thrill for me." In the first meeting with Ward, Trussell declined to join to a new project claiming he was too busy to turn his podcast into an animated show. In 2018, Ward approached him again to show a rough concept; taking a podcast conversation about drug addiction and playing it over an animatic of Trussell and his guest fighting off a zombie invasion.

Writing and production 
Later, this rough concept ended up being incorporated into the pilot of the series. The two took the concept of the series in pitching form to Mike Moon, head of adult animations at Netflix. In 2019, Netflix ordered eight episodes, which premiered on April 20, 2020. After gaining the green light, the two gathered a team of comedians like Johnny Pemberton, Brendon Walsh, "Weird Al" Yankovic and Emo Philips who were joined by occult scholar Jason Louv and white witch Maja D'Aoust. The two assembled a team of approximately 190 people at Titmouse and started working on creating the episodes. Mike Mayfield joined the project as a supervising director and writer for all the episodes. The team behind the show is composed of Jesse Moynihan (art director), Antonio Canobbio (Chief Creative Officer for Titmouse), Mike Roush (animation director) and Joey Adams (storyboard supervisor). Mayfield said that the team needed to "try something nine different ways before one little change would make it go from clunky to incredible."

During the beginning of production, they needed to know how much of the episodes would be story, how much would be a podcast conversation, and they needed to choose which parts of the podcast to use in the show. According to Trussell, the parts of the podcast chosen for the series are about highlighting revelatory moments from his career. Trussell said: "When I’m doing a podcast, there are moments where my whole universe changes because someone told me something that I never knew. Once you hear that, you’re forever changed; you live in a completely different dimension than you lived in before." When Ward and Trussell started working on the scripts, Ward said it would be like taking an Indiana Jones movie and replacing the dialogue with podcast conversations. The main idea was to turn it into an entertaining animated show. They began to develop it out to following a concept. According to Trussell that concept was "During the apocalypse, people aren’t just going to talk about the apocalypse, being in apocalyptic movies the situation revolves all around the survival.’ Sort of the genesis of the show is what would happen if we took these podcast conversations and made them the dialogue that was happening during the various forms of the apocalypse."

The concept was expanded as the writer’s room began exploring various potential apocalypses and finding a way to ensure that the podcast material was able to match up the storylines they built around the episode. This was the main challenge of writing the episodes, besides choosing the best interviews, was making them coherent for animation. Trussell described as a "laborious process" while also realizing it helped evolve into a series with a story arc. They also worked to find a way to embed them in the psychedelic apocalyptic tapestry of the animation. They thought episodes should have a balance so the animation does not take people out of the interview. With an excessive focus on animation, people would not pay attention to everything equally. The team worked to let the conversations react with the world. According to Trussell, the influence for The Midnight Gospel came from Adult Swim's lo-fi aesthetic in general and shows like Space Ghost Coast to Coast and Aqua Teen Hunger Force. Other references included the animated films Watership Down and The Last Unicorn, the animated television series Æon Flux and Liquid Television, and the mystery horror drama television series Twin Peaks.

For Ward, it was Trussell's long-form audio chats that inspired him to return to TV animation and the new series was a chance to explore making animation for adults. Until then he had made animations primarily for children and The Midnight Gospel would be a chance to change his way of making animations using the ultra-violence of cartoons with conversations on compassion. Ward also allowed Trussell to include his own original music in several episodes. Joe Wong, the composer from the show, included his own song "Dreams Wash Away" from his debut album Nite Creatures in first-season finale. The show's title came from the good news sense of the word gospel. Trussell says, "'Gospel' means good news, and I was hoping that we convey the message that even through the most catastrophic situations, when everything is falling apart, there is opportunity to grow as a person."

On June 3, 2022, Ward announced that Netflix cancelled the series after one season.<ref name="Cancellation">{{cite web|last=Moore|first=Kasey|title=The Midnight Gospel' Canceled at Netflix; Won't Be Returning for Season 2|url=https://www.whats-on-netflix.com/news/the-midnight-gospel-canceled-at-netflix-wont-be-returning-for-season-2/|work=What's On Netflix|date=June 4, 2022}}</ref>

 Themes and analysis 
Throughout the episodes, the series deals with different themes which were explored in the interviews. During the first season, the guests interviewed covered topics such as magic, meditation, forgiveness, spiritualism, funerary rituals, death positivity, drug use, pain, moksha (transcendence) and existentialism. The animation also acts as a background for stories that expand the interviews. The storylines are therefore, similarly wide-ranging. The second episode opens with deer-dog hybrids mangling baby clowns; compared to the fourth, which follows the journey of a knight seeking vengeance against an ass-wielding villain. These eclectic themes are selected in such a way as to complement the dialogue of the interview they accompany. For example, during the episode with interviewee Anne Lamott, she comments on her lack of fear of death, as her character is wheeled to an industrial meat grinder run by a shudder of clowns. These animated backstories are designed to pull the viewer into the conversation, making them an important part of the exploration of said subject.

One constant in several episodes is the life cycle. The series reinforces how this cycle is a continuous, neverending process and one cannot escape it. In the last episode of the first season, there is a deeper discussion about the miracle of life, the suffering that existence brings to human life, and the detestable pain that death brings with it. The main theme of this episode entitled "Mouse of Silver" is to deal with the loss of a loved one. Despite being the main theme in this episode, the theme reappears in several others at different levels. For Trussell, the last episode becomes even more personal due to the discourse brought by the deep sorrow he felt after he lost his mother to cancer.

 Marketing 
The first teaser was released on March 16, and the main trailer on April 6. As part of promoting the show, Netflix's YouTube channel launched a livestream on April 19, 2020 with a countdown to the series' debut on the streaming service. Throughout the livestream, small portions of the episodes were shown as well as a psychedelic animation. The user's manual for the Multiverse Simulator used by Clancy was made available online by Netflix through the show's Reddit account as part of its promotional campaign.

 Release 
The eight-episode first season, ordered by Netflix, was released on April 20, 2020. According to Trussell, Netflix executives first suggested launching the series on April 20, Trussell's birthday and the date of annual cannabis-oriented celebrations.

 Reception 
 Critical response 
Reception of the series has been largely positive, with several critics pointing to the last episode of the season called "Mouse of Silver" as the most touching and exciting of the season. The series has received praise for its visuals, animation and the way it deals with deep and philosophical subjects. On review aggregation website Rotten Tomatoes, the first season has an approval rating of 91% based on 34 reviews, with an average rating of 7.68/10. The site's consensus reads "The Midnight Gospels strange brew won't be for all tastes, but those willing to drink deep will find a wealth of vibrant visuals and illuminating insights." On Metacritic, the first season has a score of 82 out of 100, based on reviews from eight critics, indicating "universal acclaim".

In a positive review, Robert Lloyd from Los Angeles Times said the visual style is reminiscent of Adventure Time though it also has its own style, while presenting conversations about real issues. Lloyd said "Like Adventure Time, but more explicitly, it takes an interest in matters of birth, death, rebirth, transfiguration. Death especially, though this provides for some of the series' most peaceful sequences." Stuart Jeffries from The Guardian called The Midnight Gospel a trippy Mr Benn for adults and said that the show was engagingly bonkers in a quest for philosophical truth on a psychedelic journey through space. He points out how the last episode "Mouse of Silver" is the most touching and engaging episode of the season. IndieWire critic Eric Kohn gives a grade A to the first season, calling the show a deep cosmic journey. He acclaims a rich, energizing quality to these discussions as they grow more heated. "Even as the show builds to an enticing cliffhanger, it seems to suggest that living in the moment matters more than whatever happens next." In a positive critique, Joshua Robinson from Thrillist said "There's adult animation, and there's The Midnight Gospel." In a mixed review, Jesse Schedeen from IGN said "It pairs a laid-back, talk-heavy approach with lavish, surrealist animation. But much like the podcast episodes it frames itself around, there's not much in the way of an ongoing narrative to reward viewers or justify a binge session." In a less enthusiastic review for Collider, Dave Trumbore said "It's like watching a psychotic lava lamp while listening to your college roommate wax on and on after a week of Philosophy 101 and a few rounds of stacking bong hits."

Some critics have said there are both similarities and differences between The Midnight Gospel and Rick and Morty for the style of animation and the way they deal with deep themes. David Opie from Digital Spy said The Midnight Gospel is an antithesis to Rick and Morty. He said that both shows change their viewers' worldview, and "Rick and Morty might embrace nihilism more than most, thriving in the chaos of Rick's anarchic worldview, but the world ends over and over again for real in The Midnight Gospel'', providing a cosmic counterpoint to the introspective teachings of the 'space-cast'." He also said the show deals positively with topics like hope and loss.

Future 
On June 3, 2022, Trussell confirmed that the show had been cancelled by Netflix. Previously he had expressed the desire for more episodes, stating that "[the world of the Chromatic Ribbon] is a very big world. I spent a long time with Pen working out all the details. Some people might see it and think some people are saying gibberish, that something was absurd and unintended, but every brick in that structure, every piece of the puzzle is intentional and based on a lot of lore. It's a very, very, very, very interesting big world, and I would love to explore that world for as long as I possibly can." Upon revealing the cancellation, Trussell elaborated he had one more season in mind.

References

External links 
 
 

2020 American television series debuts
2020 American television series endings
2020s American adult animated television series
2020s American comic science fiction television series
2020s American surreal comedy television series
American adult animated adventure television series
Animated space adventure television series
American adult animated comedy television series
American adult animated science fiction television series
American comic science fiction television series
American adult animated fantasy television series
American animated science fantasy television series
American flash adult animated television series
Animated television series about extraterrestrial life
English-language Netflix original programming
Animated television series by Netflix
Television series about parallel universes
Television series created by Pendleton Ward
Television shows based on podcasts